Davis Township is one of nine townships in Starke County, in the U.S. state of Indiana. As of the 2010 census, its population was 1,043 and it contained 439 housing units.

Geography

Cities, towns, villages
 Hamlet (west half)

Adjacent townships
 Union Township, LaPorte County (north)
 Johnson Township, LaPorte County (northeast)
 Oregon Township (east)
 Washington Township (southeast)
 Center Township (south)
 Jackson Township (southwest)
 Hanna Township, LaPorte County (west)
 Prairie Township, LaPorte County (west)

Major highways

Airports and landing strips
 Singletons Landing Strip

School districts
 Oregon-Davis School Corporation

Political districts
 Indiana's 2nd congressional district
 State House District 17
 State Senate District 5

References
 United States Census Bureau 2008 TIGER/Line Shapefiles
 United States Board on Geographic Names (GNIS)
 IndianaMap

External links
 Indiana Township Association
 United Township Association of Indiana

Townships in Starke County, Indiana
Townships in Indiana